Catherine Cando (June 7, 1995 – January 10, 2015) was an Ecuadorean beauty queen who won the Queen of Durán pageant. A prize for the winner was a free liposuction procedure. Cando died as a result of complications during the operation.

Cando had no weight problems as child, and her sister-in law asked her to enter the Queen of Durán contest. There, she met Dr Ecuador, a plastic surgeon who worked with the Duran government and was a judge on the pageant's panel. Ecuador allegedly convinced Cando to undergo the liposuction after she had first refused, with promises that she might become his assistant at some later time (Cando wished to enter the medical field). Cando died on the operating table; Ecuador told Cando's family that the cause was brain edema, but staff later stated the cause of death was cardiac arrest as the result of a botched operation.

Cando's death sparked outrage in Ecuador against plastic surgery.

References

1995 births
2015 deaths
Ecuadorian beauty pageant winners